The 1988 Individual Long Track World Championship was the 18th edition of the FIM speedway Individual Long Track World Championship. The event was held on 18 September 1988 at Scheeßel in Germany, which was West Germany at the time.

The Championship format was altered with 16 rider fields and 8 riders in each heat. The top 8 scorers qualified for the semi final heats with (points carried forward).

The world title was won by Karl Maier of West Germany for the fourth time.

Final Classification 

 E = eliminated (no further ride)
 f = fell
 ef = engine failure
 x = excluded

References 

1988
Speedway competitions in Germany
Sport in West Germany
Sports competitions in West Germany
Motor
Motor